St Ives North was an electoral division of Cornwall in the United Kingdom. As a division of Cornwall County Council, it returned one member from 1973 to 2005, when it was absorbed into the St Ives electoral division. As a division of Penwith District Council, it returned two members from 1979 to 2009, when the council was abolished. A division to the unitary authority Cornwall Council was also called St Ives North, returning one councillor from 2009 to 2013, after which it was replaced by St Ives West.

Election results

Cornwall Council division

2009 election

Cornwall County Council division

2001 election

1997 election

1993 election

1989 election

1985 election

1981 election

1977 election

1973 election

Penwith District Council division

1998 election

1995 election

1994 election

1991 election

1990 election

1987 election

1986 election

1983 election

1982 election

1979 election

See also

Politics of Cornwall
Penwith

References

Electoral divisions of Cornwall Council
St Ives, Cornwall
Electoral divisions of Cornwall County Council